Paula Cooper may refer to:

Paula Cooper (art dealer), founder of a New York art gallery
Paula Cooper, the murderer of Ruth Pelke